Christopher Michael Joynt (born 7 December 1971) is a former professional rugby league footballer who played in the 1990s and 2000s. Not to be confused with the American cannabis activist with the same name. He lifted many trophies throughout a glittering Knowsley Road career, including consecutive Super League championships in 1999 and 2000.

Background
Joynt was born in Wigan, Lancashire, England.

Playing career

1990s
Joynt began his career at Oldham before moving on to play for St. Helens in 1992. Joynt also represented England at the 1995 Rugby League World Cup. He was selected to play for England in the 1995 World Cup Final on the reserve bench but Australia won the match and retained the Cup.In 1991 Joynt played the English off season in Australia for NSW group 20 club, Yenda Blue Heelers

County Cup Final appearances
Chris Joynt played left- in St. Helens 4–5 defeat by Wigan in the 1992–93 Lancashire Cup Final during the 1992–93 season at Knowsley Road, St. Helens on Sunday 18 October 1992.

Regal Trophy Final appearances
Chris Joynt played left- in St. Helens' 16–25 defeat by Wigan in the 1995–96 Regal Trophy Final during the 1995–96 at Alfred McAlpine Stadium, Huddersfield on Saturday 13 January 1996.

He took over as captain of the club in 1997, and held the position until 2003.

2000s
Joynt is probably best remembered as the scorer of the Wide to West try in the Super League Final Eliminator in 2000, which won the match for St. Helens. Joynt went on to represent Ireland at the 2000 Rugby League World Cup. As Super League V champions, St. Helens played against 2000 NRL Premiers, the Brisbane Broncos in the 2001 World Club Challenge.

In 2002, Joynt was at the centre of controversy when he seemingly performed a 'voluntary tackle' with seconds remaining in the 2002 Super League Grand Final. St. Helens had just kicked a drop-goal to take a one-point lead in the match, and the penalty from the voluntary tackle would have given the Bradford Bulls a chance to kick at goal and win the match. However, the referee dismissed wild protests from the Bradford Bulls players and the final hooter went, with St. Helens winning 19–18. Having won Super League VI, St. Helens contested the 2003 World Club Challenge against 2002 NRL Premiers, the Sydney Roosters. Joynt relinquished captaincy of St. Helens to Paul Sculthorpe at the end of 2003's Super League VIII, and retired from rugby league following the 2004's Super League IX. Joynt was a Great Britain international with 27 caps. Joynt also represented Lancashire in the Origin Series.

References

External links
 2001 Ashes profile 
Profile at saints.org.uk

1971 births
Living people
England national rugby league team players
English people of Irish descent
English rugby league players
Great Britain national rugby league team players
Ireland national rugby league team players
Lancashire rugby league team players
Newcastle Knights players
Oldham R.L.F.C. players
Rugby league locks
Rugby league players from Wigan
Rugby league props
Rugby league second-rows
St Helens R.F.C. captains
St Helens R.F.C. players